D. Huw Owen is a Welsh academic who is the former keeper of pictures and maps at the National Library of Wales and an historian of Wales.

Selected publications
 The Chapels of Wales
 Hanes Cymoedd y Gwendraeth a Llanelli/History of the Gwendraeth Valleys and Llanelli
 Capeli Cymru
 Settlement and Society in Wales. 1989.
 Cyflwyniad i Adran Darluniau a Mapiau: Guide to the Department of Pictures and Maps

References

External links
Official website

Living people
Archivists
Historians of Wales
21st-century Welsh historians
Welsh Presbyterians
Year of birth missing (living people)